First Edition is a debut album from the British group Paper Lace released in 1972.

Track list 

1972 debut albums
Paper Lace albums
Polydor Records albums
Bang Records albums
Philips Records albums